Phillumeny (also known as phillumenism) is the hobby of collecting different match-related items: matchboxes, matchbox labels, matchbooks, matchcovers, matchsafes, etc.

Matchbox

A matchbox is a box made of cardboard or thin wood and designed to hold matches. It usually has a coarse striking surface on one edge for lighting the matches contained inside.

Etymology
The word, derived from Greek phil- [loving] + Latin lumen- [light], was introduced by the British collector Marjorie S. Evans in 1943 (who later became president of the British Matchbox Label & Booklet Society, now renamed the British Matchbox Label and Bookmatch Society). A person who engages in phillumeny is a phillumenist. These two forms have been adopted by many other languages, e.g., philuméniste, fillumenista, Filumenist and филуменист.

Phillumeny worldwide

Collecting of matchbox labels emerged together with matches. In some collections it is possible to find labels from chemical matches, produced from 1810 to 1815—long before the modern matches arrived. Quite often people who went abroad brought back matchboxes as souvenirs from other countries. After World War II a lot of match factories worked in close contact with local phillumenists, issuing special non-advertising sets. The hobby became especially widespread from the 1960s through the 1980s. Widespread introduction of bulky (for collectors) cardboard matchboxes with less distinct images on them, much poorer quality of print and, also some social phenomena, made this hobby (like many others, not connected with commerce) much less engaged.

Notable phillumenists 
In Japan, Teiichi Yoshizawa was listed in the Guinness Book of World Records as the world's top phillumenist. In Portugal, Jose Manuel Pereira published a series of albums to catalog and display matchbox collections called "Phillalbum".

See also
 Collectable
 Go-to-bed matchbox, another (more elaborate) form of matchbox
 Matchbook, another form of packaging for matches
 Numismatics, the study and collection of coins, banknotes and other objects related to currency
 Philately, the study and collection of postage stamps and other objects related to mail and postal services

References

Further reading 
Steele, H. Thomas; Hiemann,  Jim; Dyer, Rod (1987). Close Cover Before Striking: The Golden Age of Matchbook Art NY: Abbeville Press,

External links

Historical Phillumeny - Russian language website on the history of phillumeny.
British Matchbox Label and Bookmatch Society
Glossary of phillumeny
The Home of Phillumeny
Russian and Soviet matchlabels
Matchbook Traveler - Lists restaurants that have souvenir matchbooks.
Rathkamp Matchcover Society

Collecting
Packaging
Matches (firelighting)